McCook County is a county in the U.S. state of South Dakota. At the 2020 census, the population was 5,682. Its county seat is Salem. The county was established in 1873, and was organized in 1878. It was named for the former governor of the Dakota Territory and Civil War general Edwin Stanton McCook.

McCook County is part of the Sioux Falls, SD Metropolitan Statistical Area.

Geography
The terrain of McCook County consists of rolling hills, mostly devoted to agriculture. The terrain slopes to the south and southwest; its highest point is near its northeast corner, at 1,798' (548m) ASL.

Major highways

 Interstate 90
 U.S. Highway 81
 South Dakota Highway 38
 South Dakota Highway 42

Adjacent counties

 Lake County - northeast
 Minnehaha County - east
 Turner County - southeast
 Hutchinson County - southwest
 Hanson County - west
 Miner County - northwest

Protected areas

 Ediger State Game Production Area
 Forsch Lake State State Game Production Area
 Lake Vermillion State Recreation Area
 Lehrman Slough State Game production Area
 Tschetter Slough State Game Production Area

Lakes
 East Vermillion Lake AKA Lake Vermillion
 Island Lake
 Lake Ell

Demographics

2000 census
As of the 2000 United States Census, there were 5,832 people, 2,204 households, and 1,558 families in the county. The population density was 10 people per square mile (4/km2). There were 2,383 housing units at an average density of 4 per square mile (2/km2). The racial makeup of the county was 98.87% White, 0.05% Black or African American, 0.36% Native American, 0.21% Asian, 0.15% from other races, and 0.36% from two or more races. 0.77% of the population were Hispanic or Latino of any race.

There were 2,204 households, out of which 34.10% had children under the age of 18 living with them, 62.10% were married couples living together, 5.10% had a female householder with no husband present, and 29.30% were non-families. 26.80% of all households were made up of individuals, and 15.60% had someone living alone who was 65 years of age or older. The average household size was 2.58 and the average family size was 3.15.

The county population Contained 28.40% under the age of 18, 6.20% from 18 to 24, 25.50% from 25 to 44, 20.40% from 45 to 64, and 19.50% who were 65 years of age or older. The median age was 39 years. For every 100 females, there were 99.50 males. For every 100 females age 18 and over, there were 97.20 males.

The median income for a household in the county was $35,396, and the median income for a family was $42,609. Males had a median income of $28,390 versus $21,073 for females. The per capita income for the county was $16,374. About 5.50% of families and 8.10% of the population were below the poverty line, including 8.90% of those under age 18 and 8.80% of those age 65 or over.

2010 census
As of the 2010 United States Census, there were 5,618 people, 2,168 households, and 1,535 families in the county. The racial makeup of the county was 98.0% white, 0.4% American Indian, 0.1% Pacific islander, 0.1% Asian, 0.1% black or African American, 0.6% from other races, and 0.7% from two or more races. Those of Hispanic or Latino origin made up 1.8% of the population. In terms of ancestry, 61.5% were German, 12.8% were Irish, 11.1% were Norwegian, 7.4% were Swedish, 6.2% were Dutch, 5.2% were English, and 3.5% were American.

Of the 2,168 households, 30.4% had children under the age of 18 living with them, 61.0% were married couples living together, 6.0% had a female householder with no husband present, 29.2% were non-families, and 26.2% of all households were made up of individuals. The average household size was 2.45 and the average family size was 2.94. The median age was 42.7 years.

The median income for a household in the county was $42,022 and the median income for a family was $57,287. Males had a median income of $35,951 versus $29,750 for females. The per capita income for the county was $25,502. About 5.2% of families and 7.9% of the population were below the poverty line, including 6.7% of those under age 18 and 14.4% of those age 65 or over.

Politics
McCook County voters usually vote Republican. Although the county was one only 130 nationwide to support favorite son George McGovern in 1972, it has selected the Democratic nominee in only six other elections since South Dakota's statehood, and none since 1980.

Communities

Cities

 Bridgewater
 Canistota
 Montrose
 Salem (county seat)
 Spencer

Census-designated places 

 Golden View Colony
 Orland Colony

Unincorporated communities
 Stanley Corner
 Unityville

Townships
The county is divided into sixteen townships:

Benton
Bridgewater
Brookfield
Canistota
Emery
Grant
Greenland
Jefferson
Pearl
Montrose
Union
Ramsey
Richland
Salem
Spring Valley
Sun Prairie

Other places
Laurent - (proposed / abandoned housing development)

See also
National Register of Historic Places listings in McCook County, South Dakota

References

 
Sioux Falls, South Dakota metropolitan area
1878 establishments in Dakota Territory
Populated places established in 1878